The December 2015 Taiz missile attack was a strike carried out by the pro-Saleh Yemeni Army and Houthi militants with a Tochka ballistic missile against a military camp that was being used by troops of the Saudi-led coalition, south-west of the city of Taiz. The strike inflicted numerous casualties on the coalition forces. Reports said that there were 152 casualties in the camp, including  23 Saudi, 16-18 Sudanese, 9 Moroccan, and 7 Emirati servicemen reportedly killed. Large amounts of military material were destroyed, including vehicles and air-defense systems. In addition, Houthi militants claimed to have killed at least 40 mercenaries of the Academi private military company in the missile strike.

References

Taiz
Yemeni Civil War (2014–present)
December 2015 events in Yemen
2015 in Yemen

https://www.theguardian.com/australia-news/2015/dec/09/australian-mercenary-reportedly-killed-yemen-clashes